Jermaine Johnson Sr. (born July 4, 1985) is an American politician, political advisor and former professional basketball player. A member of the Democratic Party, he is the representative for South Carolina's 70th district. Johnson previously represented the 80th district in the South Carolina House of Representatives prior to redistricting.

Early life
Johnson was born on July 4, 1985 in Los Angeles, California. He grew up during the crack epidemic and his family struggled with homelessness, living in and out of motels following home evictions. His father spent time in prison and his brother was in the military. Johnson's face was scarred when he was pistol-whipped as a teenager.

Athletic career

High school and college career
Johnson's AAU coach helped him get into prep schools for basketball. Johnson attended seven high schools while growing up including Trinity-Pawling School and Redemption Christian Academy. He eventually attended and graduated from the Winchendon School. 
 
In high school, Johnson received interest from the College of Charleston and Long Beach State for basketball. He committed to the College of Charleston. Three months into his redshirt freshman season, Johnson got into an altercation with his teammate Jeff Horowitz. Johnson intended to transfer to Long Beach State, but ended up staying at Charleston College.

In 2008, Johnson scored the first points in the TD Arena for the Cougars.

Johnson served as Charleston's captain during his senior year. He finished his career as one of only four players in school history with at least 1,100 points and 850 rebounds.

Professional career

D-League
Johnson was drafted by the Reno Bighorns in the 6th round of the NBA Development Draft. He was released from the team after one year. He trained with James Harden and Amar'e Stoudemire during summer workouts in Los Angeles.

International career
Johnson played more than six years, professionally overseas including in France, Mexico, Hungary and Canada. He starred during his time in the Mexican Basketball League where he averaged 21 points and 8 rebounds per game.

Political career

Johnson is the founder and CEO of the New Economic Beginnings Foundation, which helps educate and find employment for opportunities for troubled youth and veterans.

Currently, Johnson serves as the 3rd Vice Chair of the Richland County Democratic party, Richland County Recreation Commissioner, Vice Chair of the Young Democrats of the Central Midlands and Minority Caucus Chair of the Young Democrats of South Carolina.

Johnson served as the South Carolina Campaign Chair for Andrew Yang's 2020 presidential campaign.

South Carolina House of Representatives

In 2020, Johnson announced he would challenge Democratic incumbent Jimmy Bales for his seat in the South Carolina House of Representatives. Johnson centered his campaign around universal basic income, community investment, economic investment, district enhancement and access and accountability. He earned endorsements from former 2020 Presidential candidate Andrew Yang, former South Carolina State Representative and current CNN political analyst Bakari Sellers and current South Carolina State Representative JA Moore. In June 2020, Johnson defeated Bales in the Democratic Primary and became the Democratic nominee.

After redistricting following the 2020 United States census, Johnson's district was  merged into House District 70. This forced Johnson to run in a contested primary against fellow-representative Wendy Brawley. In the primary, Johnson garnered 50.11% person of the vote to defeat Brawley by 115 votes.

Johnson currently serves on the House Education and Public Works Committee. He is Secretary of the House Minority Caucus.

Electoral history

2020 South Carolina House of Representatives

2022 South Carolina House of Representatives

Personal life
Johnson has three children. He received a Doctorate of Business Administration and Organizational Leadership from Northcentral University in 2018.

References 

1985 births
20th-century African-American people
21st-century African-American politicians
21st-century American politicians
African-American basketball players
African-American state legislators in South Carolina
American men's basketball players
Basketball players from Los Angeles
College of Charleston alumni
Living people
Democratic Party members of the South Carolina House of Representatives
North Central University alumni
The Winchendon School alumni